FC Progress Kamensk-Shakhtinsky is a Russian football team from Kamensk-Shakhtinsky. 

Currently it plays on amateur level in the Rostov Oblast league. It played professionally from 1963 to 1970 in the Soviet Second League, their best result was 3rd place in 1964.

External links
  Team history by footballfacts

Association football clubs established in 1962
Football clubs in Russia
Sport in Rostov Oblast
1962 establishments in the Soviet Union